Josh Wander is an American perennial candidate who was the Republican nominee for Mayor of Pittsburgh in the 2013 general election. He was also featured in a segment on the reality television Doomsday Preppers. He is also a public relations consultant representing projects in, and around the Old City of Jerusalem. He holds dual citizenship in the United States and Israel.

Early life, education and career
A native of Pennsylvania, Wander graduated from a rabbinical college in Israel with a Bachelor of Talmudic Law and subsequently earned a Masters in Public and International Affairs from the University of Pittsburgh Graduate School of Public and International Affairs.

Wander maintained a blog titled "Jewish Preppers" where he wrote about disaster preparedness for Jews.

Political campaigns
Wander's first attempt at public office was his election as constable of White Oak, Pennsylvania. Since then, he has unsuccessfully sought local offices four more times:  twice for Mayor of Pittsburgh, again for Pittsburgh City Council, and yet again for Allegheny County Council.

In the 2013 election for Mayor of Pittsburgh, Wander stated his "only chance of actually winning in the race is if the Democratic nominee drops dead." Less than two months before that election it was reported Wander, while still the Republican candidate for mayor, had left Pittsburgh entirely. According to the Pittsburgh Tribune-Review, Wander sold his home in Pittsburgh and moved with his family to Israel. Republican officials expressed surprise and confusion on being informed of Wander's departure. Wander insisted he would continue his campaign for mayor of Pittsburgh from Israel, though some experts questioned the legality of such an arrangement.

Political views
In an episode of the National Geographic Channel program Doomsday Preppers, Wander was quoted as saying that he was concerned "about a series of catastrophic terrorist attacks which will fundamentally change our lives as we know them." In 2019 Wander founded the organization Bring Them Home, dedicated to educating and informing Jews living in the Diaspora of the importance of returning home to Israel. He is a certified NRA arms instructor and gun rights advocate.

Personal life

Wander is married with six children. In a 2012 interview with the Times of Israel, he reported he is considering moving back to Israel because he feels safer there, as a Jew, than in the United States. As of 2015, Wander is living in East Jerusalem and is volunteering as a paramedic.

References

External links
Josh Wander for Mayor
Smart Voters Page
Official site of the Bring Them Home Organization

Jewish American people in Pennsylvania politics
Living people
Pennsylvania Republicans
Politicians from Pittsburgh
Israeli people of American-Jewish descent
University of Pittsburgh alumni
21st-century American Jews
1970 births